Prince Adu-Addae Aning (born 23 April 2004) is a Dutch footballer who currently plays as a left-back for Borussia Dortmund II.

Club career
Aning joined Borussia Dortmund in July 2022 from Dutch side Ajax.

International career
Born in the Netherlands, Aning is of Ghanaian descent. He has represented the Netherlands at youth international level.

Career statistics

Club

Notes

References

2004 births
Living people
Footballers from Amsterdam
Dutch footballers
Netherlands youth international footballers
Dutch people of Ghanaian descent
Association football defenders
3. Liga players
AFC Ajax players
Borussia Dortmund players
Borussia Dortmund II players
Dutch expatriate footballers
Dutch expatriate sportspeople in Germany
Expatriate footballers in Germany